David A. Balfour Park is an urban park in the Deer Park neighbourhood of Toronto near the intersection of Yonge Street and St. Clair Avenue. The park made up of 20.5 hectares of green space consisting of the greenery-covered Rosehill Reservoir and the entirety of the Vale of Avoca with its system of trails.

The park is named after David A. Balfour, a former Toronto city Councillor.

History

Pre-colonial 
The area occupied by David A. Balfour Park has a long history prior to the colonization and the formation of Canada where it was an important hunting ground of the indigenous peoples, specifically the Mississaugas who referred to it as mishkodae (lit. "prairie") and maintained the area as a meadow to attract animals into the environment.

Colonial and confederation period
During the colonial period the area was originally the site of several estates residences, among them that of Walter Rose who built Rosehill in 1839 and two law partners that built Summer Hill in 1840. The transformation of area into a park began in 1873 when Toronto chose the Rosehill site and acquire the land for its first major water reservoir, the Rosehill Reservoir, with the adjoining Vale of Avoca ravine transformed into Reservoir Park. In the 1900s this portion of the ravine extending down just south of the Canadian Pacific rail tracks became also known as Summerhill Park.

The park, with it reservoir and ravine, were actively maintained as a garden with many decorative non-native trees planted. The reservoir was also freely accessible, with its frozen surface being used for recreation of the nearby residents.

Modern period 

During World War II, a fence was put up around the periphery of the open reservoir to protect the water supply from being sabotaged. Post-war, the decision was made to deepen and cover the reservoir to increase its capacity, as well as to maintain the sanitation of the water from human pollution and animal contamination. As consolation to the nearby residents in losing a well loved water feature in their neighbourhood, the city agreed to include several concrete lined ponds on the top of the enclosed reservoir.
 
The park and its ravine plays an important role in the lives of the surrounding Midtown inhabitants in their recreation and personal lives. As of 2017 the reservoir is undergoing rehabilitation with the park to be reconstructed with modifications.

After the 1986 murder of Alison Parrott, an 11-year-old resident of the nearby street of Summerhill Avenue, a green space south of the park was dedicated to Alison and the children of Summerhill and named "The Little Park".

References

External links

Parks in Toronto
First Nations sites in Toronto